DWLH (101.5 FM), broadcasting as 101.5 Brigada News FM, is a radio station owned by Brigada Mass Media Corporation. Its studios and transmitter are located along Maharlika Highway, Brgy. Pangpang, Sorsogon City.

Background
The station first went on air in 1995 as The Wave. At that time, it was owned by Hypersonic Broadcasting Center. In March 2016, it went off the air due to lack of listeners. In mid-2016, it was acquired by Brigada Mass Media Corporation and began a series of test broadcasts. On February 8, 2017, it was officially launched as Brigada News FM.

References

External links
 Brigada News FM Sorsogon Live Streaming
 Brigada News FM Sorsogon Facebook Page

Radio stations established in 1995
Radio stations in Sorsogon